The Quest is an album by American jazz pianist Mal Waldron that was released by the New Jazz in July 1962. It was recorded in June 1961, with Eric Dolphy and Booker Ervin. Some reissues of the album have appeared under Eric Dolphy's name.

Reception
The AllMusic review by Scott Yanow stated: "the complex music (which falls between hard bop and the avant-garde) is successfully interpreted. Worth checking out".

Track listing
All compositions by Mal Waldron
 "Status Seeking" — 8:52
 "Duquility" — 4:09
 "Thirteen" — 4:42
 "We Diddit" — 4:23
 "Warm Canto" — 5:37
 "Warp and Woof" — 5:36
 "Fire Waltz" — 7:58

Personnel
 Mal Waldron – piano
 Eric Dolphy – alto saxophone, clarinet
 Booker Ervin – tenor saxophone
 Ron Carter – cello
 Joe Benjamin – double bass
 Charlie Persip – drums

References

New Jazz Records albums
Mal Waldron albums
Eric Dolphy albums
1961 albums
Albums recorded at Van Gelder Studio
Albums produced by Esmond Edwards